Valmet 361 D was the third diesel tractor built by Valmet.

At the end of 1960, the 361 D was released, replacing the 359 D. It featured a new body, with a more broad and squarer style than before, although it did carry over many of the mechanical components from its predecessor.

Variants Mk1 and Mk2 
In 1962, a differential lock, an hour meter and a padded seat were all added. During the same year, a second model (MK2) was released, featuring a more advanced hydraulic system. This allowed position control, based on the top link draft control, as well as mixing control. The Mk2 also saw some cost-cutting measures, such as the Bosch fuel injection being replaced by a lower performance Simms unit, as well as Lucas electrics replacing the Bosch. The 310D engine was replaced by a cheaper 310A unit. The most prominent exterior differences between the MK1 and MK2 are a spraying device, and a lifting device connected to the hand lever.

Replacement
In 1965, a replacement was introduced in the form of the Valmet 565. The major differences between the 565 and 361 are a smaller rear wheel diameter ( vs ), and revised front grille and seat.

Valmet 361 Images

See also
All Valmet models
Volvo BM
Volvo BM Valmet
Valmet-Valtra
Valtra

Sources
 Konedata 
 Valtra
 Valmet-talli: Finnish Valmet forum
 Vanhat valmetit Ry. (Old time Valmet club, finland)
 Valtra History
 See Valmet 361 videos 

361D
Tractors